Nogat  is a village in the administrative district of Gmina Łasin, within Grudziądz County, Kuyavian-Pomeranian Voivodeship, in north-central Poland.

The village has a population of 210.

History
During the German occupation of Poland (World War II), Nogat was one of the sites of executions of Poles, carried out by the Germans in 1939 as part of the Intelligenzaktion.

Notable residents
 Curt Schimmelbusch (1860–1895), physician

References

Nogat